Edgar Stehli (July 12, 1884 – July 25, 1973) was a French-born American actor of the stage, the screen and television.

Early years
The son of an English mother and a German-Swiss father, Stehli was born in Lyon, France. The family moved to New York in 1886 and later moved to Montclair, New Jersey. He graduated from Cornell University with a bachelor's degree in 1907 and a master's degree in 1908. While at Cornell, he acted in university theatrical productions.

Career
Stehli's professional acting debut came with a stock theater company in Bayonne as he had understudy and bit-part responsibilities and worked with props. He worked there and with other stock companies until 1919, when he was invited to join the Theatre Guild.

Stehli appeared in the films Boomerang, Executive Suite, Drum Beat, The Cobweb, The Brothers Karamazov, No Name on the Bullet, 4D Man, Cash McCall, Atlantis, the Lost Continent, Parrish, Pocketful of Miracles, The Spiral Road, Twilight of Honor, Seconds, The Tiger Makes Out and Loving, among others.

His television appearances include: a 1956 role as title character “Ira Pucket” (an old cowboy trying to stay relevant) in S2E15’s “Pucket’s New Year” on the TV Western Gunsmoke plus 
Perry Mason Season 1, Episode 39 (1958) as Daniel Reed in, “The Case of the Rolling Bones”. He also appeared in an episode of The Twilight Zone.

On old-time radio, Stehli portrayed Dr. Huer in Buck Rogers in the 25th Century, D.A. Miller in Crime Doctor, and the title character in Gramps.

Stehli's acting on Broadway spanned a half-century, beginning on November 27, 1916 in Six Who Pass While the Lentils Boil and ending on November 26, 1966 in Those That Play the Clowns. In 1941 he created the role of Dr. Einstein in Arsenic and Old Lace.

At the time of Stehli's death, he was one of the oldest active members of Actors' Equity Association.

Personal life
Stehli was married to Emilie Greenough.

Death
Stehli died on July 25, 1973 at his home in Upper Montclair, New Jersey at age 89.

Filmography

References

External links
 
 

1884 births
1973 deaths
20th-century American male actors
American male film actors
People from Montclair, New Jersey
American male radio actors
American male stage actors
Male actors from New Jersey
Cornell University alumni
French emigrants to the United States